Everisto Mulenga (born 26 March 1999) is a Zambian amateur boxer. He won a bronze medal at the 2019 African Games and later qualified for the 2020 Summer Olympics by winning the African Qualification Tournament, both at featherweight.

Career
Mulenga won a silver medal at the 2016 African Region V Youth U20 Games in Luanda, losing to Ricardo Malajika of South Africa in the finals. He reached the quarterfinals of the bantamweight event at the 2018 Commonwealth Games, where he won his first bout before suffering a loss to Mohammad Hussamuddin. Mulenga won a featherweight bronze medal at the 2019 African Games in Rabat. He won three straight fights before losing to the eventual gold medalist Mohamed Hamout in the semifinals.

Mulenga qualified for the 2020 Summer Olympics with a first-place finish at the African Qualification Tournament, where he defeated veteran Nick Okoth in the final via unanimous decision. At the Tokyo Olympics, he received a first-round bye in the featherweight bracket. Mulenga began his first bout against Ceiber Ávila by opening a cut above his opponent's eye in the first round, but he ultimately lost the fight by split decision.

References

External links
 Amateur boxing record for Everisto Mulenga from BoxRec

Living people
1999 births
Zambian male boxers
Bantamweight boxers
Featherweight boxers
Boxers at the 2018 Commonwealth Games
Commonwealth Games competitors for Zambia
Competitors at the 2019 African Games
African Games medalists in boxing
African Games bronze medalists for Zambia
Olympic boxers of Zambia
Boxers at the 2020 Summer Olympics
21st-century Zambian people